"Que c'est triste Venise" (literal English translation: "How Sad Venice Is") is a song written by Armenian-French artist Charles Aznavour and Françoise Dorin and sung by Aznavour about Venice. It was first recorded in French by Aznavour in 1964, and later in Spanish ("Venecia sin ti"), German ("Venedig im Grau"), English ("How Sad Venice Can Be" or "Venice Blue" cover of Bobby Darin), and most notably in 1971 in Italian ("Com'è triste Venezia").

In 1964-1965 it was on Top Hit charts of Billboard (France, Rio de Janeiro, Brazil, etc.) and was an international hit.

Italian poet Giulia Niccolai dedicated her 'Como è trieste Venezia' love poem to Charles Aznavour (for his well-known song) and to Adriano Spatola.

Awards
In 1964 it received a Blason d'Or award as one of the top hits of the year.

References

Charles Aznavour songs
1964 songs
Songs written by Françoise Dorin
Songs written by Charles Aznavour
Songs about Italy
Songs about cities
Works about Venice